Arthur Jabulani Zwane (born 20 September 1973) better known as "10111" is a South African professional  football coach and former player. He spent most of his career with Kaizer Chiefs, and is currently their head coach.

Born in Meadowlands, South Africa, Zwane is one of the most decorated players to ever Amakhosi colours in South African football. He won multiple major trophies, including the Premier Soccer League, MTN8, and Nedbank cup.

Early career
Zwane grew up playing for his uncle's team, Liverpool, and later played for Jomo Cosmos's under 10 side. He was promoted in 1992 and was sent on loan to Real Rovers.

Club career

Jomo Cosmos
Arthur Zwane made his professional debut in the BobSave Super Bowl quarter final against Giyani Classic in 1993 under Roy Matthews. Zwane continued to play for Cosmos after being relegated in 1993. He won the NSL Second Division with Cosmos in 1994.

Orlando Pirates
Zwane played 12 matches at Orlando Pirates before being sent on loan to Dynamos in the National First Division.

Tembisa Classic
Zwane played for Tembisa Classic under Khabo Zondo. He scored eight goals in the 1999/2000 to help the team to a 9th-place finish.

Kaizer Chiefs
Zwane joined Chiefs in 2000 after a tug of war battle between Pirates claiming Zwane as their player and Chiefs claiming Lesley Manyathela as their own. He made his debut on 22 July 2000 in a 1–0 win over Wits University. Zwane won three trophies during "Operation Vat Alles" in 2000/01. He scored his first goal on 8 August 2004 in a 2–1 win over Manning Rangers. In 2004, he was banned for 2 years after testing positive for Methyltestosterone, an anabolic steroid. The ban was later reduced to six months. He played his last match on 4 November 2009 against Mpumalanga Black Aces.

Coaching Career 
On 27th May 2021, Zwane joined Kaizer Chiefs as the team's assistant manager. He served the position during the 2020/2021 season. On 9th June 2021, he was appointed as the team's caretaker manager. On 26th May 2022, he signed a new contract as the team's manager. He is currently serving as the Kaizer Chiefs manager.

References

External links

Doping cases in association football
South African soccer players
South Africa international soccer players
South African sportspeople in doping cases
Association football midfielders
Kaizer Chiefs F.C. players
Orlando Pirates F.C. players
Jomo Cosmos F.C. players
Sportspeople from Soweto
1973 births
Living people
Dynamos F.C. (South Africa) players
Kaizer Chiefs F.C. non-playing staff